Gran Hotel may refer to:

Hotels 
 Gran Hotel Bali, a 4-star hotel located in Benidorm, Spain
 NH Gran Hotel Provincial, a five star establishment in Mar del Plata, Argentina
 Gran Hotel (Arrecife), a skyscraper in Arrecife, Canary Islands, Spain
 Gran Hotel (Costa Rica), San José, Costa Rica
 Gran Hotel (Palma), Palma de Mallorca, Spain
 Gran Hotel Almería
 Gran Hotel Bolivar
 Gran Hotel Guadalpin Banús
 Gran Hotel Manzana Kempinski La Habana
 Gran Hotel Montesol Ibiza
 Gran Hotel Torre Catalunya

Fiction

 Gran Hotel (TV series), a 2011 Spanish drama television series 
 Gran Hotel (film), a 1944 Mexican film

Music

 "Gran Hotel", a song by Interpol from their 2022 album The Other Side of Make-Believe